Park Place Historic District is a national historic district located at Niagara Falls in Niagara County, New York.  It encompasses 89 contributing buildings, one contributing site, one contributing structure, and one contributing object. It is principally a residential district built up between 1885 and 1928. The dominant architectural styles are Italianate, Queen Anne, Colonial Revival, and Arts and Crafts.  Within the district is a park with prominent obelisk, known as "The Cenotaph," and a notable stone fence.  Located within the district is the separately listed James G. Marshall House.
r
It was listed on the National Register of Historic Places in 2010.

References

External links

Houses on the National Register of Historic Places in New York (state)
Historic districts on the National Register of Historic Places in New York (state)
Italianate architecture in New York (state)
Queen Anne architecture in New York (state)
Colonial Revival architecture in New York (state)
Houses in Niagara County, New York
National Register of Historic Places in Niagara County, New York